Netiv, a Hebrew word meaning path, may refer to the following places in Israel:

 Netiv HaGdud
 Netiv HaLamed-Heh
 Netiv HaShayara
 Netiv HaAsara
 Netiv Ha’avot

See also 

 Netivot